Ahmed Al Naqbi (Arabic:أحمد النقبي) (born 9 March 1998) is an Emirati footballer. He currently plays as a forward for Ittihad Kalba.

Career

Ittihad Kalba
Al Naqbi started his career at Ittihad Kalba and is a product of the Ittihad Kalba's youth system. On 29 November 2016, Al Naqbi made his professional debut for Ittihad Kalba against Al-Nasr in the Pro League, replacing Ciel .

Leganés C (loan)
On 19 November 2019 left Ittihad Kalba and signed with Leganés C With the player Mayed Mohsen on loan until the end of the season beginning in January 2020 after the Sharjah Sports Council signed a cooperation agreement with the Spanish club.

External links

References

1998 births
Living people
Emirati footballers
Emirati expatriate footballers
Al-Ittihad Kalba SC players
UAE Pro League players
UAE First Division League players
Association football forwards
Expatriate footballers in Spain
Emirati expatriate sportspeople in Spain
Place of birth missing (living people)